Actia nigra is an eastern Palearctic species of fly in the family Tachinidae.

Distribution
Japan.

References

nigra
Diptera of Asia
Insects described in 1970